Francisco Navas Cobo (born November 17, 1991 in Houston, Texas), known as Francisco Navas, is an American soccer player.

Career

Professional
Navas was invited to go on trial with the Houston Dynamo, when preseason training started in early February. After having a successful trial for the first team,  he became the second home grown player to be promoted from the Dynamo's developmental academy (after Houston Dynamo goalkeeper Tyler Deric), when he signed a professional development contract with Houston on March 5, 2010.

He made his professional debut on April 17, 2010, in a game against Chivas USA.

Navas was waived by Houston on November 23, 2011.

International
At age 14, Navas participated at a United States Under-15 camp. At age 18, he made his national team debut with the under-20 team on March 28, 2010 at the 2010 Dallas Cup.

References

External links
 

1991 births
Living people
American soccer players
Deportivo Cali footballers
Houston Dynamo FC players
Soccer players from Houston
Major League Soccer players
Atlético Bucaramanga footballers
United States men's under-20 international soccer players
Association football midfielders
Homegrown Players (MLS)